Wife acceptance factor, wife approval factor, or wife appeal factor (WAF) is an assessment of design elements that either increase or diminish the likelihood a wife will approve the purchase of expensive consumer electronics products such as high-fidelity loudspeakers, home theater systems and personal computers. Stylish, compact forms and appealing colors are commonly considered to have a high WAF. The term is a tongue-in-cheek play on electronics jargon such as "form factor" and "power factor" and derives from the stereotype that men are predisposed to appreciate gadgetry and performance criteria whereas women must be wooed by visual and aesthetic factors.

History
Larry Greenhill first used the term "Wife Acceptance Factor" in September 1983, writing for Stereophile magazine, but Greenhill credited fellow reviewer and music professor Lewis Lipnick with the coining of the term. Lipnick himself traces the origin to the 1950s when hi-fi loudspeakers were so large that they overwhelmed most living rooms.  Foreman suggested that audiophile husbands should balance their large and ugly electronic acquisitions with gifts to the wife made on the basis of similar expense, with opera tickets, jewelry and vacations abroad among the suggestions.

The concept existed before 1983. At the start of the golden age of radio in the early 1920s, most radio broadcasters and listeners were men with technical skills. Covers of Radio News depicted humorous situations of women deploring their men's obsession with the new science. Women disliked homemade radio receivers' clutter; electrical parts were left exposed after assembly, the necessary multiple wet-cell batteries leaked corrosive battery acid, and a cable spaghetti of wires connected everything. Replacement acid was sold as "battery oil" to avoid women's reluctance to have the substance in homes.

A way of fitting radio into a home's existing decor was disguising receivers as furniture, a topic discussed in the press as early as 1923. As self-contained, preassembled radios using AC power became available, manufacturers recognized the importance of what a 1924 Radio Broadcast article's headline described as "Making Radio Attractive to Women". Radio News in 1926 held a contest to design the ideal radio receiver exterior; the winning women's entry suggested that it be useful as furniture.

As women increasingly influenced radio purchases, and the devices moved from the man's den to the living room, a 1927 article in Radio Broadcast stated that a "receiver, to be fully appreciated by the female half of the domestic republic, must be encased in housings which are esthetically as well as technically satisfactory". Elaborate radio cabinets often composed most of the price difference between models that used similar electronic components. The components could be replaced while retaining the cabinet as permanent furniture; they had doors that completely hid the radio when not in use. After 1930, elaborate cabinets became less common as newer, smaller table radios became popular, and because the technology was widely accepted by men and women.

References

Wives
Consumer electronics